(born November 19, 1974) is a Japanese cross-country skier who has competed since 1993. His best World Cup finish was ninth in a 4 x 10 km relay at Switzerland in 2001.

Kozu also competed in three Winter Olympics, earning his best finish of 12th in the 4 x 10 km relay at Salt Lake City in 2002. His best finish at the FIS Nordic World Ski Championships was ninth in the 4 x 10 km relay at Val di Fiemme in 2003.

References

1974 births
Cross-country skiers at the 1994 Winter Olympics
Cross-country skiers at the 1998 Winter Olympics
Cross-country skiers at the 2002 Winter Olympics
Japanese male cross-country skiers
Living people
Olympic cross-country skiers of Japan
Asian Games medalists in cross-country skiing
Cross-country skiers at the 2003 Asian Winter Games
Medalists at the 2003 Asian Winter Games
Asian Games gold medalists for Japan
Asian Games silver medalists for Japan
Universiade medalists in cross-country skiing
Universiade gold medalists for Japan
Competitors at the 1995 Winter Universiade
20th-century Japanese people